The Lutheran University of Brazil (Portuguese:  or ULBRA) is a university which covers several states throughout Brazil.

History 
The university has its roots in the parish school of St. Paul's Lutheran Church of Canoas (CELSP), in Canoas, Rio Grande do Sul, founded in 1911. The first impulse towards the university was the creation of the Cristo Redentor College, in 1969 under the direction of Reverend Ruben Eugen Becker.

In March 1972, in an effort to expand its education in higher education, the Evangelical Lutheran Community of São Paulo founded an Administration College with fifty vacancies. In 1974, the Federal Council of Education authorized the operation of the Canoas Colleges.

In January 1988, the president of Brazil, José Sarney, allowed the creation of the Lutheran University of Brazil.

Campuses 
The university's headquarters is located in the city of Canoas, in the state of Rio Grande do Sul (the southernmost province of Brazil). Within this state, Ulbra also has campuses in the cities of Cachoeira do Sul, Carazinho, Gravataí, Guaíba, Porto Alegre, Santa Maria, São Jerônimo and Torres. Apart from these cities, the university also has campuses in the states of Amazonas (Manaus), Goiás (Itumbiara), Pará (Santarém), Rondônia (Ji-Paraná and Porto Velho), Tocantins (Palmas) and in the state of São Paulo.

Academics 
ULBRA offers several majors, including medicine, which the university became entitled to offer after building its hospital, located within the university premises and currently serving the community of Canoas and neighbouring cities.

Athletics 
The university has a football team that plays in the first division of the Campeonato Gaúcho, as well as having teams participate in many sports tournaments, including volleyball, basketball, judo and athletics. As of 2007, Sport Club Ulbra have contested the Campeonato Brasileiro Third Division for the fourth time in a row, but have not been successful in their attempts towards promotion.

Automobile museum 
The school previously maintained a large museum of technology which had a collection of more than 200 vehicles from a Ford Model T to a 2000 Chevrolet Corvette and even the formula racing car driven by Emerson Fittipaldi when he won the Indianapolis 500 along with that race's pace car. In 2009, due to the institution's financial problems, the museum was closed and the collection auctioned. Currently, the Museum of Technology building houses the studios of Ulbra TV (a local educational TV station affiliated with TV Cultura), and Radio Mix FM 107.1.

External links 

 Official Website (in Portuguese)

Lutheran universities and colleges
Educational institutions established in 1972
1972 establishments in Brazil
Universities and colleges in Rio Grande do Sul
Christian universities and colleges in Brazil
Canoas
Universities and colleges in Pará